William Rankin and Elizabeth Wharton Smith House is a historic home located near Whitsett, Guilford County, North Carolina. It consists of a one-story, side-gable-roofed, hall-parlor dwelling built about 1846, with a room added about 1854, and two-room ell with a full-length porch to the rear about 1885. The Coastal Cottage form dwelling has Greek Revival style design elements.  The house was moved to its present location, about 6/10th of a mile from its original site, in June 2005.

It was listed on the National Register of Historic Places in 2007.

References

Houses on the National Register of Historic Places in North Carolina
Greek Revival houses in North Carolina
Houses completed in 1846
Houses in Guilford County, North Carolina
National Register of Historic Places in Guilford County, North Carolina